Burhan is an Arabic male name.

Burhan may also refer to:


Places
 Burhan, Pakistan, town located along the Rawalpindi-Peshawar road, in the Punjab province of Pakistan
 Burhan Interchange, interchange located in the west of Hasan Abdal city in Attock District, Pakistan
 Aq Burhan, a village in Aleppo Governorate, Syria

Books
 Al-Burhan, an 11th-century exegesis on the Quran
 Burhan al-Haqq, a 1963 theological work by Nur Ali Elahi

Other uses
 Burhan (Pashtun tribe)

See also
 Burhan G (album), a 2010 album by Burhan G
 
 Burhaniye (disambiguation)
 Burhaniyya